There are several places in Hong Kong with the name Sai Tso Wan:
Sai Tso Wan, Lantau on Lantau Island, New Territories, near Sham Wat. Site of the Battle of Shancaowan
Sai Tso Wan, Kowloon in Kwun Tong District, Kowloon, near Lam Tin and Cha Kwo Ling - see Sai Tso Wan Recreation Ground
Sai Tso Wan, Tsing Yi on the Tsing Yi Island, New Territories

Bays of Hong Kong